Dərəgünəş (also, Dere-Khanysty and Dere-Khynysly) is a village in the Shamakhi Rayon of Azerbaijan.

References 

Populated places in Shamakhi District